Down the Stretch is a 1927 American drama film directed by King Baggot and written by Curtis Benton. The film stars Robert Agnew, Marian Nixon, Virginia True Boardman, Lincoln Plumer, Jack Dougherty, and Ward Crane. The film was released on May 29, 1927, by Universal Pictures.

Cast        
Robert Agnew as Marty Kruger
Marian Nixon as Katie Kelly
Virginia True Boardman as Mrs. Kruger
Lincoln Plumer as Devlin
Jack Dougherty as Tupper
Ward Crane as Conlon
Ben Hall as Pee Wee
Otis Harlan as Babe Dilley
Ena Gregory as Marion Hoyt

References

External links
 

1927 films
1927 drama films
1920s sports drama films
American sports drama films
American horse racing films
Universal Pictures films
Films directed by King Baggot
American silent feature films
American black-and-white films
1920s English-language films
1920s American films
Silent American drama films
Silent sports drama films